Count Felix Nikolayevich Sumarokov-Elston (24 January 1820 – 30 October 1877) was the Ataman of the Kuban Cossacks and the Governor of Kuban Oblast (region) in the late 1860s.

Parents 

Felix (a common name for illegitimate children) was brought up by Princess Elisabeth Khitrovo, a famous salon hostess who was a daughter of Prince Kutuzov and the mother of Dorothea de Ficquelmont. It has been widely rumored that Felix Elston was the natural son of Khitrovo's eldest daughter, Countess Ekaterina von Tiesenhausen (a lady-in-waiting to King Frederick William IV of Prussia's sister, Empress Alexandra of Russia) and Prince Augustus of Prussia.

It appears more likely that Felix's parents were Karl Alexander Anselm Freiherr von Hügel (Regensburg, April 25, 1795 – Brussels, June 2, 1870) [himself the son of Johann Aloys Josef Hügel, later 1st Freiherr von Hügel (Koblenz, November 14, 1753 – Regensburg, 1826) and wife Anna von Holthof, married in 1787] by Jozefa Gräfin Andrássy de Csíkszentkirály et Krasznahorka (Košice (Kassa), April 8, 1790 – 1868), a relative of Gyula Andrássy, married (in Košice (Kassa), February 7, 1808) to Miklós Graf Forgách de Ghymes et Gács (1784 – Nagyszalánc (Slanec), January 10, 1857), by whom she had three sons, all of whom died unmarried and without any issue. Recent investigations undertaken by one of his great-granddaughters and an English genealogist practically confirm this late ancestry, not explaining, however, the motives why he didn't use his father's name but Elston, his English nanny's surname.

Career 
Felix Elston was prominent during the Siege of Sevastopol and was promoted to Colonel in 1855. After his marriage in 1853 with the Heiress of Counts Sumarokov, he received the title of Count Sumarokov-Elston. By Imperial Decree of September 8, 1859 he was authorized to use the hereditary title of his father-in-law, with the condition of using his surname. From 23 August 1863 to 3 February 1869 he was an Ataman of Kuban Cossacks and from 1865 he was a governor of Kuban.

During his military service Count Felix Sumarokov-Elston received numerous awards, including Order of St. Vladimir of 1st degree, Order of St. Stanislav of 1st degree, Order of St. Anna of 1st degree with crown and others.

After 1868 he left military service because of poor health and lived abroad. He was a Russian representative at the wedding of Prince Milan of Serbia and Russian noblewoman Natalia Keshko, in 1875 he was attached to King Oscar II of Sweden during his visitation of Russia. In 1875, he was appointed the head of the Kharkov military district.

Issue 

From his marriage with Countess Elena Sergeievna Sumarokova (September 5, 1829 – April 15, 1901) (daughter of Count Sergei Pavlovich Sumarokov (1791-1875) and wife Marchesa Aleksandra Pavlovna Maruzzi (ca 1808–1857)) he had seven children, including Count Felix Felixovich Sumarokov-Elston, later prince Yusupov, who was the father of Prince Felix Yusupov.

References

 
"A la Découverte de Leurs Racines" - Joseph Valynseele et Denis Grando - L'Intermediaire des Chercheurs et Curieux, Paris, 1988

External links
 Atamans of Kuban Cossacks
 History of Kuban Cossacks
 All Russia Family Tree

1820 births
1877 deaths
Imperial Russian Army generals
Recipients of the Order of St. Vladimir, 1st class
Recipients of the Order of Saint Stanislaus (Russian), 1st class
Recipients of the Order of St. Anna, 1st class
House of Yusupov
Counts of the Russian Empire